Edwin O. Kull (February 7, 1855 – August 25, 1941) was an American farmer, educator, and politician.
Born in the Town of Bloomfield, Walworth County, Wisconsin, Kull attended Wheaton College. He taught school in both Illinois and Walworth County. Kull had a farm in the town of Bloomfield and was involved with the farmers' cooperative creamery and fire insurance company. He served as justice of the peace, Bloomfield town assessor, and on the Bloomfield town board. In 1909, Kull served in the Wisconsin State Assembly as a Republican. Kull died in Elkhorn, Wisconsin on August 25, 1941.

References

1855 births
1941 deaths
People from Walworth County, Wisconsin
Wheaton College (Illinois) alumni
Educators from Illinois
Educators from Wisconsin
Farmers from Wisconsin
Wisconsin city council members
Republican Party members of the Wisconsin State Assembly